Nösnäsvallen is a stadium in Stenungsund, Sweden. It is the home ground of the football team Stenungsunds IF. It is also usable for athletics. The Swedish national football team trained at Nösnäsvallen before both World Cup 1990 and Euro 2008. The stadium also has an olympic running course and it has been used by Sweden national olympic team for training.

Football venues in Sweden